{{for|the wrestler Chief Little Wolf|Ventura Tenario}} 

Little Wolf (Cheyenne: Ó'kôhómôxháahketa, sometimes transcribed Ohcumgache or Ohkomhakit, more correctly translated Little Coyote''', 18201904) was a Northern Só'taeo'o Chief and Sweet Medicine Chief of the Northern Cheyenne. He was known as a great military tactician and led a dramatic escape from confinement in Oklahoma back to the Northern Cheyenne homeland in 1878, known as the Northern Cheyenne Exodus.

Overview

Born in present-day Montana, by the mid-1840s, Little Wolf had become a prominent chieftain of the Northern Cheyenne, leading a group of warriors called the "Elk Horn Scrapers" during the Northern Plains Wars. He fought in Red Cloud's War, the war for the Bozeman Trail, which lasted from 1866 to 1868. As chief, he signed the Treaty of Fort Laramie.

He was chosen one of the "Old Man" chiefs among the Council of Forty-four, a high honor in traditional Cheyenne culture. He was also chosen as Sweet Medicine Chief, bearer of the spiritual incarnation of Sweet Medicine, a primary culture hero and spiritual ancestor of the Cheyenne. Because of this honorary title, he was expected to be above anger, as well as concerned only for his people and not for himself.

Battles

He was not present at the Battle of the Little Bighorn, but played a part before and after the battle. Some scouts from his camp apparently found some food left behind by Custer's attack force, and were observed by U.S. military scouts. This fact was reported to Custer, who incorrectly assumed he had been discovered by the main camp of Sioux and Cheyenne on the Little Bighorn, and urgently pressed on with his attack, trying to prevent the escape of the Indians. After the battle, Little Wolf arrived and was detained and almost killed by the angry Sioux, who suspected he was scouting for the whites. Only his fierce denial of complicity in the attack and the support of his fellow Northern Cheyenne present during the fighting saved him from harm.

Defeat and exile

In November 1876, the bands of Little Wolf and Dull Knife camped on the Red Fork of the Powder River in Wyoming Territory. In the early morning of November 25, units of the Second, Third, and Fifth U.S. Cavalry commanded by Colonel Ranald S. Mackenzie attacked. The Cheyennes were defeated, and Little Wolf and Dull Knife surrendered. In 1877, the Bureau of Indian Affairs decided to send Little Wolf, Dull Knife, and their people to the Darlington Agency in Indian Territory.

Escape from Indian Territory

Following the defeat of Dull Knife and Little Wolf by Col. Ranald S. Mackenzie at the Dull Knife Fight in November 1876, Little Wolf and Dull Knife surrendered.  They were forced onto a reservation in Oklahoma's Indian Territory. The Northern Cheyennes found life at Darlington Agency intolerable. Malaria and other diseases plagued them, and the agency failed to provide sufficient medical supplies, beef rations, or winter clothing. Forty-one people died that winter.  Little Wolf and Dull Knife requested permission to return with their people to Montana, but agent John DeBras Miles and the Indian Bureau repeatedly denied their requests. In September 1878, Little Wolf and Dull Knife led almost 300 Cheyenne from their reservation near Fort Reno, Oklahoma, through Kansas, Nebraska, and the Dakota Territory into the Montana Territory, their ancestral home.

During the journey, they managed to elude the U.S. cavalry units which were trying to capture them. The two groups split up after reaching Nebraska, and while Dull Knife's party was eventually forced to surrender near Fort Robinson, those in Little Wolf's group made their way to Montana where they were finally allowed to remain.
Chapter 29, "Little Wolf and Dull Knife, 1876-79", pages 398 to 413 and Chapter 30, "The Fort Robinson Outbreak", pages 414 to 427, The Fighting Cheyennes, George Bird Grinnell, University of Oklahoma Press (1956, Scribner's Sons 1915), hardcover, 454 pages

Later life
Little Wolf would later become a scout for the U.S. Army under Gen. Nelson A. Miles. He was involved in a dispute which resulted in the death of Starving Elk. Little Wolf was intoxicated when he shot and killed him at the trading post of Eugene Lamphere on December 12, 1880. Little Wolf went into voluntary exile as a result of this disgrace. His status as a chief was revoked.

In his later years, he lived on the Northern Cheyenne Indian Reservation, where he died in 1904. He is interred in the Lame Deer cemetery, alongside the gravesite of Morning Star. George Bird Grinnell, a close friend and ethnographer who documented Little Wolf's life, called him, "the greatest Indian I have ever known."

Timeline

Little Wolf
 1820 Birth
 1856 Involved in the affair of the 'stolen' horse at the Platte Bridge
 1866 Takes part in the Fetterman Fight
 1868 Signs a treaty with the U.S. Government at Fort Laramie
 1868 Burns Fort Phil Kearny
 1873 Visits Washington, D.C.
 1876 Takes part in the Dull Knife Fight
 1877 Ordered to go south to confinement in Oklahoma
 1878 Leads dramatic escape from reservation and returns to Montana
 1879 Scouts for the U.S. military
 1880 Kills Starving Elk; removed as Chief; goes into voluntary exile
 1904 Death

Cheyenne Timeline
 17th-18th century: Migrated from Minnesota to North Dakota
 1804: Visited by the Lewis and Clark Expedition
 1851: Ft. Laramie Treaty
 1859: Colorado Gold Rush
 1864: Colorado War
 1864: November, Sand Creek massacre
 1868: Battle of Washita River
 1876: Battle of the Little Bighorn
 1877: Moved to Indian Territory
 1884: New reservation established near the Black Hills

Errata

"Little Wolf" is a fairly common name among American Indians. More than one Cheyenne chief bore the name, an early example being a Southern Cheyenne chief who participated in a famous horse-stealing raid (c. 1830) on the Comanches with Yellow Wolf.

See also
Eugene Little Coyote
Marie Sanchez - a direct descendant of Little Wolf.

Notes

 Fisher, Louise; Wayne Leman, Leroy Pine Sr., Marie Sanchez (2006) Cheyenne Dictionary. Lame Deer, Montana: Chief Dull Knife College
 Britannica Student Encyclopedia

Further reading
Berthrong, Donald J., The Cheyenne and Arapaho Ordeal: Reservation and Agency Life in the Indian Territory, 1875–1907, University of Oklahoma Press, 1976.
 Grinnell, George Bird, The Cheyenne Indians: Their History and Ways of Life, Yale University Press, 1924.
 Grinnell, George Bird, Fighting Cheyennes, University of Oklahoma Press, 1915.
 Sandoz, Mari, Cheyenne Autumn, McGraw-Hill, 1953.
 Stands in Timber, John, and Margot Liberty, Cheyenne Memories, Yale University Press, 1967.
 Svingen, Orlan J., The Northern Cheyenne Indian Reservation'', 1877–1900, University Press of Colorado, 1993.

References

External links
 Cheyenne Honor Little Wolf: Chief led ancestors of today's tribe to homeland in 1879
 Little Wolf as Remembered by Ohiyesa (Charles A. Eastman)
 This Day in History: March 25, 1879, Cheyenne Chief Little Wolf surrenders

1820s births
Year of birth uncertain
1904 deaths
Native American leaders
Northern Cheyenne people
People of the Great Sioux War of 1876
People of pre-statehood Montana